Duncan Davidson may refer to:
 Duncan Davidson (Cromartyshire MP, born 1733) (1733–1799), Scottish merchant and Member of Parliament
 Duncan Davidson (Cromartyshire MP, born 1800) (1800–1881), Scottish landowner and Member of Parliament, grandson of the above
 Duncan Davidson (businessman) (born 1940), British businessman, founder of Persimmon plc
 Duncan Davidson (footballer) (born 1954), Scottish footballer